was a private university in Matsusaka, Mie, Japan, established in 1982. Formerly known as Matsusaka University, the school adopted the present name in 2005. Discountined in 2013.

History
The Mie Chukyo University opened as Matsusaka University in 1982 as the first university in Mie Prefecture specialising in social sciences. The Departments of Political Economy, Political Science, and Economics were established. A Teacher Training Department was established in 1987, and a master's degree graduate program for the School of Political Science was established in 1997. This was expanded into a doctoral program in 1999.
The school changed its name to Mie Chukyo University in 2005. The school closed its Teacher Training Department in 2007 and closed its Junior College in March 2011.

Organization
Four-year program
 Faculty of Law and Contemporary Economics 
 Department of Modern Law and Economics
Graduate program
Graduate School of Policy Science ( MSc, PhD )

External links
 Official website 

Educational institutions established in 1982
Educational institutions disestablished in 2013
Universities and colleges in Mie Prefecture
1982 establishments in Japan
Defunct private universities and colleges in Japan
Matsusaka, Mie
2013 disestablishments in Japan